Wilhelm Denifl (born 10 November 1980) is a retired Austrian nordic combined skier who has competed between 2000 and 2019. He won a gold medal in the 4 x 5 km team event at the 2003 FIS Nordic World Ski Championships in Val di Fiemme and finished 8th in the 15 km individual event at those same championships.

Denifil has only one victory in his career in the World Cup, in January 2014, in Chaykovsky. He owns the record for the most starts in the World Cup - 295.

References

Austrian male Nordic combined skiers
1980 births
Living people
FIS Nordic World Ski Championships medalists in Nordic combined
Nordic combined skiers at the 2014 Winter Olympics
Nordic combined skiers at the 2018 Winter Olympics
Olympic Nordic combined skiers of Austria
Sportspeople from Tyrol (state)
Olympic bronze medalists for Austria
Olympic medalists in Nordic combined
Medalists at the 2018 Winter Olympics